Lombadan-e Hajjiabad (also Romanized as Lombadān-e Ḩājjīābād and Lombadān Ḩājjīābād) is a village in Howmeh Rural District, in the Central District of Deyr County, Bushehr Province, Iran. At the 2006 census, its population was 555, in 103 families.

References 

Populated places in Deyr County